Colotis evanthe is a butterfly in the family Pieridae. It is found on Madagascar and the Comoros. The habitat consists of forests, forest margins and unnatural grasslands.

References

Butterflies described in 1836
evanthe
Butterflies of Africa
Taxa named by Jean Baptiste Boisduval
Lepidoptera of the Comoros
Lepidoptera of Madagascar